Ka I 21–18 Hang Sai was a football match held on 16 June 2019 involving two teams in Macau. The fixture was part of the 2019 Taça de Macau. Players of both Ka I and Hang Sai decided to use the competitive match as a means of protest against the Macau Football Association for its role in the withdrawal of the Macau national team from the 2022 FIFA World Cup qualifiers.

Background

The tie between Kai I and Hang Sai in the 2019 Taça de Macau was held on 16 June 2019 after the Macau Football Association (MFA) decided to withdraw its national team from the 2022 FIFA World Cup qualifiers. The result of the match up between the two Macanese club was a protest against the federation's decision. The match was a playoff in order to determined which among the two clubs would advance to the quarterfinal of the cup tournament.

Macau entered the 2022 FIFA World Cup qualifiers in the first round of the Asian qualifiers and had to outbest Sri Lanka in a home-and-away playoff. Macau won 1–0 over Sri Lanka in the first tie. The second match was to be held away in Sri Lanka but the MFA decided against sending a team citing security concerns following the 2019 Sri Lanka Easter bombings. Macau national team players has appealed against this decision and was willing to waive the federation responsibility over their safety so they could play their second qualifier match in Sri Lanka but this request has been denied.

The MFA requested the Football Federation of Sri Lanka to have the match played in a neutral venue but the proposal was denied with the Sri Lankan federation insisting that adequate security measures were adopted for the then-scheduled match.

2022 FIFA World Cup qualification – AFC First Round matches involving Macau and Sri Lanka

The last competitive match between Ka I and Hang Sai prior to their 2019 Taça de Macau match was in the 2019 Liga de Elite. Hang Sai won 2–0 in that match.

Match details
Both Ka I and Hang Sai players scored unchallenged with a goalkeeper being one of the goalscorers of the Taça de Macau match. Hang Sai player Lam Ka Chong scored the first goal in the 4th minute. By half-time the scoreline was 6–5 in favor of Ka I. and the scoreboard at the stadium stopped working when the scoreline reached 21–17. The match reportedly ended prematurely by officials who determined that players from both clubs were not playing a competitive game. The result of the match was officially recorded as a Ka I 21–18 win over Hang Sai.

Aftermath
The Macau Football Association launched an investigation regarding the Taça de Macau match while both Ka I and Hang Sai conducted their own internal investigations. Players involved from both clubs clarified that the way they played was a decision they made and not reflective of their club's official stance. On 10 July, the association cancelled the result and Ka I's quarter-finals appearance, allowing their intended opponent Chao Pak Kei to advance to the semi-finals.

In the other playoff match held on the same day as the Ka I-Hang Sai tie, Monte Carlo won 2–0 against Policia, also advancing to the next round.

See also
AS Adema 149–0 SO l'Emyrne

Notes

References

Association football controversies
2019 in Macau football
2019 in Asian football
June 2019 sports events in China
2019 protests
Protests in Asia
Controversies in Asia
Football in Macau
Macau national football team